The Croton Dam Mound Group, also known by the designations 20NE105, 20NE112, and 20NE116,  is an archaeological site that was once a ceremonial site located on 2.3 acres near Croton, Michigan. It was listed on the National Register of Historic Places in 2009.

Description
The Croton Dam Mound Group consists of three mounds designated Croton Dam A (20NE105), Croton Dam B (20NE112), and Croton Dam C (20NE116).  The group represents an Early Woodland Period.  The largest mound, Croton Dam A, measures about 35 feet in diameter, and included a cache of animal bones and weapons points.  The two smaller mounds, Croton Dam B and C, contained red ochre and cremated human remains.

References

Further reading

Archaeological sites on the National Register of Historic Places in Michigan
Buildings and structures in Newaygo County, Michigan
National Register of Historic Places in Newaygo County, Michigan